Nangal Puthiyavargal is a 1990 Tamil-language drama film directed by R. G. Elavalagan and produced by V. Kondian, C. Balamani and P. Kadhiravan. The film stars Murali, Rekha, Chinni Jayanth and Chakravarthy.

Cast

Murali as Gowri
Rekha as Bharathi
Chinni Jayanth as Chandramohan
Chakravarthy as Vidyasagar
J. Lalitha as Lalitha
Rajathi
MRK
Oru Viral Krishna Rao
Loose Mohan
Joker Thulasi
Omakuchi Narasimhan as Balamurugan
Vijayasree
Naveena
Bhuvaneswari
Mahendar
Chaplin Natarajan
Rajesh
Raja as Raja (Guest appearance)

Soundtrack

References

1990 films
1990s Tamil-language films